Hafenpolizei is a German television series. It was filmed in Hamburg.

External links
 

German crime television series
1960s German police procedural television series
1963 German television series debuts
Television shows set in Hamburg
1966 German television series endings
German-language television shows
Das Erste original programming